Charles (953 – 22 June 992×995) was the Duke of Lower Lorraine from 977 until his death.

Life
Born at Reims in the summer of 953, Charles was the son of Louis IV of France and Gerberga of Saxony and the younger brother of King Lothair. He was a sixth-generation descendant of Charlemagne. When his father was captured by the Normans and held, both his sons were demanded as ransom for his release. Queen Gerberga would only send Charles, who was then handed over and his father was released into the custody of Hugh Capet.

In or before 976, he accused Lothair's wife, Emma, daughter of Lothair II of Italy, of infidelity with Adalberon, Bishop of Laon. The council of Sainte-Macre at Fismes (near Reims) exonerated the queen and the bishop, but Charles maintained his claim and was driven from the kingdom, finding refuge at the court of his cousin, the emperor Otto II. Otto promised to crown Charles as soon as Lothair was out of the way and Charles paid him homage, receiving back Lower Lorraine.

In August 978, Lothair invaded Germany and captured the imperial capital of Aachen, but failed to capture either Otto or Charles. In October, Otto and Charles in turn invaded France, devastating the land around Reims, Soissons and Laon. In the latter city, the chief seat of the kings of France, Charles was crowned by Theodoric I, Bishop of Metz. Lothair fled to Paris and was there besieged. But a relief army of Hugh Capet's forced Otto and Charles to lift the siege on 30 November. Lothair and Capet, the tables turned once more, chased the German king and Charles back to Aachen and retook Laon.

Around 979, Charles transferred the relics of Saint Gudula from Moorsel to the Saint Gaugericus chapel on Saint-Géry Island near Brussels. This is generally accepted as the time when the city was founded. Charles would construct the first permanent fortification in the city, doing so on that same island.

As he had been a vassal also of Lothair, Charles's acts on behalf of Otto were considered treason and he was thereafter excluded from the throne. On Lothair's death (986), the magnates elected his son Louis V and on the latter's death (987), Hugh Capet. Thus, the House of Capet came to the throne over the disgraced and ignored Charles. Charles's unexceptional marriage and his lack of wealth are two of the reasons he was denied the throne. Charles made war on Hugh, even taking Rheims and Laon. However, on Maundy Thursday (26 March) 991, he was captured, through the perfidy of the Bishop Adalberon, and was imprisoned by Hugh in Orléans. He was succeeded as Duke of Lower Lorraine by his son Otto.

There is uncertainty over the date and place of Charles's death. The necrology of the diocese of Liège dates Charles's death to 22 June without specifying the year. Sigebert of Gembloux records it under the year 991, but he may have confused it with his capture, since two documents of January 992 seem to imply that Charles was still alive. One was dated by a supporter to the fifth year of "Charles king in waiting" (sperante Karolo rege), the other is dated by Hugh's reign, "Charles being thrown in prison" (Karolo trusus in carcere). He must have been dead by 995, when Adalberon and Count Odo of Blois tried to install his son Louis on the throne. His death is sometimes placed in Orléans, but this is pure conjecture.

The Historia Francorum Senonensis, written between 1015 and 1034, propagated the view that Charles was the rightful king in 987 and Hugh a usurper. In 1666, the lead sarcophagus of Charles was discovered in the Basilica of Saint Servatius in Maastricht with an inscription bearing the date 1001. This appears to be the date of his interment in Maastricht, however, and not of his death. Probably his son Otto had his body moved. While the sarcophagus remains, the original inscription has been lost.

Family
In 970 Charles married Adelaide of Troyes. Together he and Adelaide had:

Otto, succeeded as Duke of Lower Lotharingia
Ermengarde, who married Albert I, Count of Namur
Gerberga of Lower Lorraine (b. 975–1018), who married Lambert I, Count of Louvain
Louis ( 989 – aft. 993)
Charles (b. 989)

References

Sources

Further reading

Gwatkin, H. M., Whitney, J. P. (ed.) et al. The Cambridge Medieval History: Volume III. Cambridge University Press, 1926.

953 births
990s deaths
People from Laon
Dukes of Lower Lorraine
Burials at the Basilica of Saint Servatius
Sons of kings